Diobsud Creek Glacier is in North Cascades National Park in the U.S. state of Washington and is on the east slopes of Bacon Peak. The ridge is an arête which separates Diobsud Creek Glacier from Green Lake Glacier to the north.

See also
List of glaciers in the United States

References

Glaciers of the North Cascades
Glaciers of Whatcom County, Washington
Glaciers of Washington (state)